Propionivibrio dicarboxylicus is a gram negative, strictly anaerobic, non-spore-forming bacterium from the genus of Propionivibrio which was isolated from anaerobic mud from the Lake Kasumigaura in Japan.

References

External links
Type strain of Propionivibrio dicarboxylicus at BacDive -  the Bacterial Diversity Metadatabase

Rhodocyclaceae